Pickup on South Street is a 1953 Cold War spy film noir written and directed by Samuel Fuller, and released by the 20th Century Fox studio. The film stars Richard Widmark, Jean Peters, and Thelma Ritter. It was screened at the Venice Film Festival in 1953. In 2018, Pickup on South Street was selected for preservation in the United States National Film Registry as being "culturally, historically, or aesthetically significant."

Plot
On a crowded New York City subway train, pickpocket Skip McCoy steals Candy's wallet. Unbeknownst to Skip or Candy, in the wallet is microfilm of top-secret government information. Candy was delivering an envelope as a final favor to her ex-boyfriend, Joey. Joey has told her that it contains stolen business secrets and she believed him, unaware that Joey is actually a communist spy.

Government agent Zara had Candy under surveillance, hoping she would lead him to the top man in the spy ring. He seeks police help to identify the thief. Police Captain Dan Tiger has professional informant Moe Williams brought in. She asks Zara several questions about the pickpocket's technique, and after she and Tiger agree on a price, she gives him a list of eight names; Zara quickly identifies Skip from his mug shot. Zara tries to get Skip to give up the film, revealing its importance and appealing to his (non-existent) patriotism, but Skip denies everything.

Meanwhile, Joey persuades a reluctant Candy to track down the thief using her underworld connections. The trail leads to Moe, who is delighted to be able to sell the same information a second time, knowing that her good friend Skip will not mind.

Candy searches Skip's waterfront shack that night while he is out. When he returns, he spots her flashlight, sneaks in and knocks her out. When she comes to, she tries to get the film from him without success. The second time she visits, she is puzzled when he calls her a "commie" and "a Red" and demands $25,000 for the film. He reveals that he knows what is on the film. Skip thinks she is only acting. Despite his rough treatment, however, she finds herself falling for him.

When she returns to Joey, his superior gives him a day to get the film back, and leaves him a gun. Candy finally realizes the truth. She turns to Moe for help, since Skip will not believe it if she tells him he is in danger. Moe tries, but fails, to convince Skip to give the film to the government. Moe goes home, and finds Joey waiting for her. Moe refuses to reveal Skip's address, taunting Joey, and he shoots her dead.

The next morning, Skip returns home to find Candy there. She blames herself for Moe's death, but to her dismay, Skip is still willing to deal with Joey. When he starts to leave with the film, she knocks him out with a bottle and takes it to Zara and Tiger. Zara asks her to give Joey the film, so he can lead them to his boss. Candy does, but Joey notices that there is a frame missing. He beats Candy in an attempt to get Skip's address, then shoots her as she tries to leave. In her purse, Joey finds Skip's address. Skip visits Candy in the hospital and comforts her.

Joey and an associate go to the shack, but Skip hears them coming and hides underneath. When Joey is ordered to deliver the portion of film he does have, Skip follows him to a subway station. He watches as the film is exchanged in a restroom, then knocks out the ringleader and chases after and beats up Joey.

Later, at the police station, Tiger predicts Skip will return to his criminal ways, but he and a recovered Candy leave together.

Cast

 Richard Widmark as Skip McCoy
 Jean Peters as Candy
 Thelma Ritter as Moe
 Murvyn Vye as Captain Dan Tiger
 Richard Kiley as Joey
 Willis Bouchey as Zara
 Milburn Stone as Winoki
 Parley Baer as Heavyset HQ Communist (sitting in chair) 
 George E. Stone as Willie, Police Desk clerk
 Stuart Randall as Detective

Production
Darryl F. Zanuck showed Fuller, who was then under contract to 20th Century Fox, a script by Dwight Taylor called Blaze of Glory about a woman lawyer falling in love with a criminal she was defending in a murder trial. Fuller liked the idea but knew from his previous crime reporter experience that courtroom cases take a long time to play out. Fuller asked Zanuck if he could write a story of a lower criminal and his girlfriend that he originally titled Pickpocket but Zanuck thought the title too "European".

Fuller had memories of South Street from his days as a crime reporter and came up with his new title. Fuller met Detective Dan Campion of the New York Police Department to research the background material of his story to add realism, with Fuller basing the role of "Tiger", the police detective, on Campion who had been suspended without salary for six months for manhandling a suspect.

Fuller turned down many actresses for the lead role including studio favorites Marilyn Monroe; Shelley Winters; Ava Gardner, who looked too glamorous; Betty Grable, who wanted a dance number written in; and initially Jean Peters, whom he did not like when he saw film of her in Captain from Castile. With only a week to go before the film started production, Fuller saw Peters walk into the studio's commissary while having lunch. Fuller noticed Peters walked with a slightly bow-legged style that many prostitutes also had. Fuller was impressed with Peters' intelligence, spunkiness, and different roles at the studio when he tested her the Friday before shooting started on the Monday. When Betty Grable insisted on being in the film and threatened to cause problems, Fuller threatened to walk off the film. Peters got the role.

In August 1952, the script was deemed unacceptable by the Production Code, by reasons of "excessive brutality and sadistic beatings, of both men and women". The committee also expressed disdain for the vicious beating of the character "Candy" (Peters), on the part of "Joey" (Kiley). Although a revised script was accepted soon after, the studio was forced to shoot multiple takes of a particular scene as the way Peters and Kiley frisk each other for loot was considered too risqué.

The French release of the movie removed any reference to spies and microfilm in the dubbed version. They called the movie Le Port de la Drogue (Drug's harbour). The managers of 20th Century Fox thought that the theme of communist spies was too controversial in a country (France) where the Communist Party was an influential and legitimate part of public life.

FBI director J. Edgar Hoover had lunch with Fuller and Zanuck, and said how much he detested Fuller's work and especially Pickup on South Street. Hoover objected to Widmark's unpatriotic character especially his line "Are you waving the flag at me?", the scene of a Federal agent bribing an informer and other things. Zanuck backed Fuller up, telling Hoover he knew nothing about making movies, but removed references to the FBI in the film's advertising.

Adaptations
In June 1954, Ritter co-starred alongside Terry Moore and Stephen McNally in a Lux Radio Theatre presentation of the story. 20th Century Fox remade the picture in 1967 as The Cape Town Affair, directed by Robert D. Webb and starring Claire Trevor (in the Thelma Ritter role), James Brolin (in his first leading role), and Jacqueline Bisset.

Reception

Critical response 
When the film was released, reviews were somewhat mixed. Bosley Crowther wrote,

It looks very much as though someone is trying to out-bulldoze Mickey Spillane in Twentieth Century-Fox's Pickup on South Street, ... this highly embroidered presentation of a slice of life in the New York underworld not only returns Richard Widmark to a savage, arrogant role, but also uses Jean Peters blandly as an all-comers' human punching-bag. Violence bursts in every sequence, and the conversation is slangy and corrupt. Even the genial Thelma Ritter plays a stool pigeon who gets her head blown off ... Sensations he has in abundance and, in the delivery of them, Mr. Widmark, Miss Peters, Miss Ritter and all the others in the cast do very well. Murvyn Vye, as a cynical detective, is particularly caustic and good, and several other performers in lesser roles give the thing a certain tone.

The staff at Variety magazine said of the film,

If Pickup on South Street makes any point at all, it's that there is nothing really wrong with pickpockets, even when they are given to violence, as long as they don't play footsie with Communist spies ... Film's assets are partly its photography, which creates an occasional tense atmosphere, and partly the performance of Thelma Ritter, the only halfway convincing figure in an otherwise unconvincing cast ... Widmark is given a chance to repeat on his snarling menace characterization followed by a look-what-love-can-do-to-a-bad-boy act as Widmark's hard-boiled soul melts before Peters' romancing.

In recent years, critical appraisals of Pickup have warmed considerably. The movie has a 92% rating on Rotten Tomatoes from 38 reviews with an average score of 7.8/10. Roger Ebert regards Pickup as one of Fuller's "noir classics."

Rick Thompson suggests that Pickup may have been the basis of Robert Bresson's Pickpocket (1959), with which it shares many themes,

 ... including the death of the mother-figure; the hero's problem making commitment to the potential lover; a series of philosophical dialogues between the hero and his police antagonist; the interlinking of pickpocketing and sexuality; and the construction of the pickpocket hero as an extreme and deliberate outsider."

Nominations
 Academy Awards: Oscar, Best Actress in a Supporting Role, Thelma Ritter, 1953.
 Venice Film Festival: Golden Lion, Samuel Fuller, 1954.

Preservation
The Academy Film Archive preserved Pickup on South Street in 2002.

References

External links

 
 
 
 
Pickup on South Street: Extra! Pickpocket Foils Doom Plot! an essay by Lucy Sante at the Criterion Collection

1953 films
1950s spy thriller films
20th Century Fox films
American spy thriller films
American black-and-white films
Cold War spy films
Film noir
Films directed by Samuel Fuller
Films set in New York City
Films scored by Leigh Harline
United States National Film Registry films
1950s English-language films
1950s American films